Jose Emmanuel "Bobbit" Lozada Carlos (born December 25, 1957), is a Filipino physician and politician who last served as the Representative of the 1st District of Valenzuela to House of Representatives of the Philippines. He also served as the city's councilor from 1998 to 1992, vice mayor from 1992 to 1995, and mayor from 1995 to 2004.

Education
Carlos finished his elementary education at the Pio Valenzuela Elementary School in 1970 and his secondary education at St. Jude Academy in 1974. He obtained his Bachelor of Science (1978) and Doctor of Medicine (1982) degrees from the University of Santo Tomas.

Career history
A medical doctor by profession, Carlos began his practice as an adjunct resident at the Department of Surgery of José R. Reyes Memorial Medical Center from 1984 to 1985, and then as a municipal physician at the Municipal Health Department of Valenzuela from 1985 to 1987. He also practiced at his mother's private clinic in Palasan. 
 
His political career began in 1988. He served as a councilor (1988–1992), vice mayor (1992–1995), mayor (1995–2004), and finally as 1st District Representative (2004–2007) of Valenzuela City. In 2007, he ran in the mayoral election but was defeated by incumbent Mayor Sherwin Gatchalian.

Personal life
Carlos is married to Margarita Cruz. They have one son, King.

References
"Personal Information, Jose Emmanuel L. Carlos." (September 6, 2007).

Living people
1957 births
Lakas–CMD (1991) politicians
Members of the House of Representatives of the Philippines from Valenzuela, Metro Manila
Mayors of Valenzuela, Metro Manila
Metro Manila city and municipal councilors
People from Valenzuela, Metro Manila
Filipino medical doctors
Filipino public health doctors